The Maryland Transit Administration was originally known as the Baltimore Metropolitan Transit Authority, then the Maryland Mass Transit Administration before it changed to its current name in October 2001. The MTA took over the operations of the old Baltimore Transit Company on April 30, 1970.

Many routes of the agency's current bus lines are based on the original streetcars operated by the Baltimore Transit Company and its parent companies between the 1890s and 1960s. All of these routes were ultimately converted to rubber tire bus operations, and many were consolidated, extended into newly developed areas, or otherwise reconfigured to keep up with the ridership demands of the times. Additional routes and extensions were added in later years to serve newly developed communities and to feed into Metro and Light Rail stations.

With the growth in popularity of the private automobile during the 20th century, streetcar and bus ridership declined, and the needs for public transportation changed. Mass transit in Baltimore and other cities shifted from a corporate operation to a tax-subsidized, state-run service. The amount of service provided was greatly reduced. Some areas once served by streetcars are now served minimally by buses or not at all.

The demise of the Baltimore streetcar took place between the years of 1947 and 1963, hastened by National City Lines' acquisition, which said that buses offered lower maintenance and had greater flexibility in traffic. With its rails demolished, Baltimore was no longer a streetcar city. As transit needs and trends changed, rail transit did return to the city, with the Metro Subway opening in 1983 and the Light Rail in 1992.

This track gauge is now confined to the Baltimore Streetcar Museum.

Parent companies
The following bus companies operated many of the services later provided by the Maryland Transit Administration:

Baltimore Transit Company
The Baltimore Transit Company (BTCO) was a privately owned public transit operator that provided streetcar and bus service in Baltimore from 1935. It was the successor to the old United Railways and Electric Company, formed in 1899 to consolidate and operate Baltimore's streetcar lines. The company was purchased in 1948 by National City Lines and the streetcar system was then run down in favor of buses, a process repeated in many places, which became known as the Great American Streetcar Scandal. The last streetcar ran in 1963. Between 1940-1959, Baltimore Transit also operated trolley buses (or "trackless trolleys") on six lines, including Howard Street and Federal Street.

BTCO was absorbed by what is now the Maryland Transit Administration in 1970. The BTC oversaw the elimination of streetcar service in favor of bus service in 1963 when the last streetcar routes, the number 8 providing service from Catonsville to Towson and the number 15 (Overlea to Walbrook Junction) were eliminated on November 3, 1963.

In the midst of the Civil Rights Movement, the BTCO fired a white bus driver who claimed to be the Grand Wizard of the Baltimore Ku Klux Klan. A labor arbitrator ruled in favor of BTCO in this firing, which was in part spurred by other white drivers threatening to strike if the man was not dismissed.

Old Court Bus Lines
Old Court Bus Lines was a service that provided van transport in northwest Baltimore County. Its lines served places including Stevenson and Villa Julie College. These services have been provided by MTA since 1973, though much of them have been cut back or modified. Bus Route 60 serves Stevenson University, which used to be known as Villa Julie.

Rosedale Passenger Lines
Operated service in eastern Baltimore County. Most of its services later became a part of Bus Route 23. The only one still provided by MTA is service to Victory Villa, on Route 4.

Dundalk Bus Lines
Dundalk Bus Lines provided service in various parts of southeast Baltimore County between 1940 and 1972. MTA serves some of these areas with Bus Route 4.

McMahon Services
Operated in northeast Baltimore County to locales such as Lutherville and Jacksonville. The only route incorporated by MTA was Route 19A, which later became known as Route 105. Discontinued in 2005.

Job Express Transit
Operated several routes during the 1960s. Most notably, Route H became known as the #7 Rosewood Express serving Rosewood Center for more than 30 years. The #7 Rosewood Express service ultimately became Route 102 in 2000, and was absorbed by Route M-17 in 2005. Route M-17, along with this service, was eliminated in 2009.

Auxiliary Bus Lines
Operated some of the routes around the city, such as what is now Route 51.

Baltimore Streetcar Museum
A track providing service at the Baltimore Streetcar Museum was designated in 1970 as Route 25, and was renamed LocalLink 25 in June 2017.

June 2017 Bus Redesign
There was a bus redesign in June 2017 called BaltimoreLink.

Local routes prior to June 2017

Neighborhood Shuttle Bug routes prior to June 2017

Shuttle and Circulator routes prior to June 2017

School Supplementary routes prior to June 2017

Local Express routes prior to June 2017

Note:
 All AM trips are to Downtown Baltimore
 All PM trips are to outer-points usually the suburbs of Baltimore
 Local express routes are not individual routes

QuickBus routes prior to June 2017

Express routes prior to June 2017

Former bus routes

See also 
 United Railways and Electric Company

References

Maryland Transit Administration
MTA Maryland
5 ft 4½ in gauge railways